Mount Anthony Union High School is the public high school serving Bennington, Vermont, as well as the towns of Shaftsbury, Woodford, and Pownal.

As of the 2015–16 academic year, the school has about 969 students enrolled in grades 9-12 and has a faculty of nearly 100.

It is easily accessible from US Route 7, VT Route 279, and the Green Mountain Express Red Line bus.

Mount Anthony is the third-largest school in the state of Vermont. The average graduation rate is eighty-five percent. 
The school yearbook is officially known as the Patriot Ledger, and the school newsletter is called Mount Anthony Connections. Additionally, the school runs a bi-weekly sports newsletter, The Patriot Press, which reports on the school's athletic teams.

The sports teams in their athletic program are collectively known as the Patriots. Led by head coach Brian Coon, the Patriots wrestling team holds the national record for most consecutive state titles won as of 2019 (31).

The Mount Anthony Football team is also very successful being state champion runner-ups in the 1986–1987, 1992–1993 and 2021-2022 season and state champions in the 1994–1995 season. As of 11/6/2021 they play in Division II in the state of Vermont. They host home games at Spinelli Field.

The Southwest Tech campus is housed on the school's campus.

Notable alumni

 Nicole Levesque, former Charlotte Sting (WNBA) guard

References

External links
 Official MAUHS website

Public high schools in Vermont
Buildings and structures in Bennington, Vermont
Schools in Bennington County, Vermont